Keratin 6C (protein name K6C; gene name KRT6C), is a type II cytokeratin, one of a number of isoforms of keratin 6 encoded by separate genes located within the type II keratin gene cluster on human chromosome 12q. This gene was uncovered recently by the Human Genome Project and its expression patterns in humans remains unknown.

Keratins 

Keratins are the intermediate filament proteins that form a dense meshwork of filaments throughout the cytoplasm of epithelial cells. Keratins form heteropolymers consisting of a type I and a type II keratin.  Keratins are generally expressed in particular pairs of type I and type II keratin proteins in a tissue-specific and cellular differentiation-specific manner.

The keratin proteins of epithelial tissues are commonly known as "keratins" or are sometimes referred to as "epithelial keratins" or "cytokeratins".  The specialized keratins of hair and nail are known as "hard keratins" or "trichocyte keratins". Trichocytes are the specialized epithelial cells from which hair and nail are composed.  Trichocyte keratins are similar in their gene and protein structure to keratins except that they are especially rich in the sulfur-containing amino acid cysteine, which facilitates chemical cross-linking of the assembled hard keratins to form a more structurally resilient material.

Both epithelial keratins and hard keratins can be further subdivided into type I (acidic) keratins and type II (neutral-basic) keratins.  The genes for the type I keratins are located in a gene cluster on human chromosome 17q, whereas the genes for type II keratins are located in a cluster on human chromosome 12q (the exception being K18, a type I keratin located in the type II gene cluster).

Like the closely related KRT6A and KRT6B genes, the KRT6C gene consists of 9 exons separated by 8 introns and is located in the type II keratin gene cluster on human chromosome 12q.  Keratin 6A and keratin 6B are encoded by the neighbouring genes, which are identical in intron-exon organization to KRT6C and are more than 99% identical in their DNA coding sequences.

Genetic disorders 

Mutations in K6C have been identified as being able to cause diffuse and focal palmoplantar keratodermas. This has been identified as a form of Pachyonychia congenita.

References

Further reading 
 

Keratins